McCloud Railway No. 19, also known as Yreka Western No. 19, or Oregon, Pacific and Eastern No. 19, is a preserved 2-8-2 "Mikado" type steam locomotive in the United States that worked on the Caddo and Choctaw Railroad, United States Smelting, Refining and Mining Company McCloud River Railroad, Yreka Western Railroad, and the Oregon, Pacific, and Eastern Railway. It was purchased new from the Baldwin Locomotive Works (BLW) in 1915. Shortly after retirement, the engine operated on the Yreka Western before being moved up to Cottage Grove, Oregon to run on the OP&E. In the late 1980s, #19 was sent back down to Yreka, California to run on the YW. In April of 1994, the engine returned to McCloud, California to run a series of excursions on the McCloud, Railway. It has since been used in the films Emperor of the North Pole, Bound for Glory, and Stand By Me. As of 2022, No. 19 is being restored at the Age of Steam Roundhouse in Sugarcreek, Ohio.

Revenue career 
No. 19 was built by the Baldwin Locomotive Works in April 1915 as Caddo and Choctaw Railroad No. 4. It was Baldwin's 42,000th locomotive produced. The locomotive was also christened with the name of R.L Rowan; an engineer on the railroad. In the early 1920s, No. 4 was sold the Choctaw River Lumber Company while still retaining her No. 4. The engine worked in Arkansas until 1920, when the locomotive was sold off to the United States Smelting, Refining and Mining Company, based out of Boston, Massachusetts. The engine was then sent to Pachuca, Mexico, a silver rich region northeast of Mexico City. The locomotive was repainted and re-lettered "Cia de Real del Monte y Pachuca" as their No. 105. Around the time that the engine was sent to Mexico, it was apparently converted to burn oil instead of coal. It was also while the engine was in Mexico that it got its nickname, Pancho. Legend goes that No. 19 had a run in with Mexican revolutionary, Pancho Villa, hence, her nickname was born. After a four-year stint in Mexico, No. 105 was again sold to the McCloud River Railroad in Northern California, which renumbered it to No.19 as they had an identical locomotive to No. 19, No. 18. It was also revealed that when the crews in McCloud, California, were fixing and repainting the locomotive in 1920, bullet holes were discovered in the locomotive's cab and exterior. The engine worked in regular service on the McCloud River Railroad until purchased by the Yreka Western Railroad three decades later in 1958.

Excursion era 
After its retirement from the Yreka Western in 1963, the railroad decided to tap into the steam excursion potential and took out both Numbers 18 and 19 for runs between Yreka and Montague. While owned by YW, No. 19 was leased for summertime excursion service in Oregon on the Oregon, Pacific, and Eastern Railway of Cottage Grove, Oregon. In 1988, the OP&E was abandoned and No. 19 returned to the Yreka Western. In April 1994, No. 19 returned to McCloud, California, to operate on the McCloud Railway. No. 19 returned to Yreka and operated on the railroad until 2008, when the engine was taken out of service. However, that would be the last time No. 19 operated on the Yreka Western.

Custody battle 
Since the Rocky Mountain Mining Railway took control of the Yreka Western Railroad, they had issues with paying off debts. No. 19 was eventually seized by the Siskiyou County Sheriff's Office because of the Yreka Western refusing to pay its debts.

Age of Steam Roundhouse 
In October of 2016, the Siskiyou County Sheriff's Office sold the No. 19 locomotive at an auction to the Age of Steam Roundhouse in Sugarcreek, Ohio for $400,000. As of 2022, the engine is being restored to operational condition.

Gallery

See also 

 California Western 45
 Lake Superior and Ishpeming 33
 McCloud Railway 25
 Polson Logging Co. 2
 Valley Railroad 40

References 

2-8-2 locomotives
Individual locomotives of the United States
Standard gauge locomotives of the United States
Railway locomotives introduced in 1915
Preserved steam locomotives of Ohio
Baldwin locomotives
Freight locomotives